Jonathan Holland (born 30 August 1991) is a retired Irish rugby union player. He played as a fly-half for Munster and Cork Constitution.

Cork Constitution
Holland was awarded the 2012–13 Ulster Bank Young Player of the Year Award for Division 1A.

Munster
Holland made his Munster A debut on 19 November 2011, coming on as a substitute against Neath. He made his senior debut for Munster on 23 November 2013, coming on as a substitute against Cardiff Blues. Holland was awarded a development contract with the senior Munster squad for the 2014–15 season in March 2014. Holland was nominated for the John McCarthy Award for Munster Academy Player of the Year on 1 May 2014.

Holland made his first start for Munster on 19 September 2014, against Zebre in the Pro12. He signed a two-year contract with Munster in January 2015, advancing from a development contract to a full contract.

On 25 March 2016, Holland started against Zebre in a 2015–16 Pro12 game, scoring 10 points. On 2 April 2016, Holland started against Leinster, scoring all of Munster's points, including a try, in Munster's 16–13 defeat. On 1 September 2016, it was announced that Holland had been forced to retire from rugby with immediate effect after being advised to do so on medical grounds, having suffered a recurrence of a hamstring injury first sustained in November 2014.

Coaching
Holland joined Cork Constitution's coaching team ahead of their 2017–18 season, working with the backs.

References

External links
Munster Profile
Pro14 Profile

Living people
1991 births
People educated at Coláiste Chríost Rí
Alumni of University College Cork
Rugby union players from County Cork
Irish rugby union players
Cork Constitution players
Munster Rugby players
Rugby union fly-halves